Palandöken Mountain (or shortly Palandöken) is a  high tectonic mountain in Erzurum Province, Turkey.

Skiing

The ski trail is the longest in Turkey. Because of the quality of the snow (a fine-grained light powder), steepness of the slopes and the length of the trail, Palandoken is known as the best mountain in Turkey for skilled skiers. The toughest run is on the backside of the mountain, known as the Ejder (Turkish for "Dragon") trail. Due to fog and risk of avalanche, the Ejder lifts and trails are sometimes closed. The skiing season may begin in November and last as long as until June. In 2008-2010 more lifts have been opened, now there are 8 in all, and the trails have been improved.

There are four hotels on the mountain: Polat Renaissance hotel, Dedeman hotel, Dedeman Ski Lodge, Palan Hotel and Xanadu Snow White. Because of the center's close proximity to Erzurum, visitors can also stay in hotels in Erzurum, where the range of hotel standards is wider.

2011 Winter Universiade
In 2011, Erzurum hosted the 25th Winter Universiade. The alpine skiing competition took place at the newly constructed Konaklı Ski Resort, while the freestyle skiing and snowboarding competitions was held at the Palandöken Ski Resort.

References

External links
 Palandöken Travel Notes 
 25th Universiade Erzurum 2011 

Erzurum
Mountains of Turkey
Ski areas and resorts in Turkey
Landforms of Erzurum Province